An All-American team is an honorary sports team composed of the best amateur players of a specific season for each team position—who in turn are given the honorific "All-America" and typically referred to as "All-American athletes", or simply "All-Americans". Although the honorees generally do not compete together as a unit, the term is used in U.S. team sports to refer to players who are selected by members of the national media.  Walter Camp selected the first All-America team in the early days of American football in 1889.  The 2016 NCAA Men's Basketball All-Americans are honorary lists that include All-American selections from the Associated Press (AP), the United States Basketball Writers Association (USBWA), the Sporting News (TSN), and the National Association of Basketball Coaches (NABC) for the 2015–16 NCAA Division I men's basketball season. All selectors choose at least a first and second 5-man team. The NABC, TSN and AP choose third teams, while AP also lists honorable mention selections.

The Consensus 2016 College Basketball All-American team is determined by aggregating the results of the four major All-American teams as determined by the National Collegiate Athletic Association (NCAA). Since United Press International was replaced by TSN in 1997, the four major selectors have been the aforementioned ones. AP has been a selector since 1948, NABC since 1957 and USBWA since 1960.  To earn "consensus" status, a player must win honors based on a point system computed from the four different all-America teams. The point system consists of three points for first team, two points for second team and one point for third team. No honorable mention or fourth team or lower are used in the computation. The top five totals plus ties are first team and the next five plus ties are second team.

Although the aforementioned lists are used to determine consensus honors, there are numerous other All-American lists. The ten finalists for the John Wooden Award are described as Wooden All-Americans. The ten finalists for the Senior CLASS Award are described as Senior All-Americans.  Other All-American lists include those determined by USA Today, Fox Sports, Yahoo! Sports and many others. The scholar-athletes selected by College Sports Information Directors of America (CoSIDA) are termed Academic All-Americans.

2016 Consensus All-America team
PG – Point guard
SG – Shooting guard
PF – Power forward
SF – Small forward
C – Center

Individual All-America teams

By player

By team

AP Honorable Mention:

Josh Adams, Wyoming
Ryan Anderson, Arizona
Anthony Barber, NC State
DeAndre' Bembry, Saint Joseph's
Ben Bentil, Providence
Trevon Bluiett, Xavier
Joel Bolomboy, Weber State
Evan Bradds, Belmont
Dillon Brooks, Oregon
Cane Broome, Sacred Heart
John Brown, High Point
Antonio Campbell, Ohio
Kyle Collinsworth, BYU
Stephen Croone, Furman
James Daniel III, Howard
Juan'ya Green, Hofstra
Derrick Griffin, Texas Southern
Alex Hamilton, Louisiana Tech
A. J. Hammons, Purdue
Marvelle Harris, Fresno State
Josh Hart, Villanova
Danuel House, Texas A&M
Brandon Ingram, Duke
Stefan Janković, Hawaii
Tim Kempton Jr., Lehigh
Max Landis, IPFW
Shawn Long, Louisiana–Lafayette
Dallas Moore, North Florida
Nic Moore, SMU
Gary Payton II, Oregon State
Alec Peters, Valparaiso
Justin Robinson, Monmouth
Domantas Sabonis, Gonzaga
Justin Sears, Yale
Pascal Siakam, New Mexico State
Melo Trimble, Maryland
Fred VanVleet, Wichita State
Thomas Walkup, Stephen F. Austin
Jameel Warney, Stony Brook
Isaiah Whitehead, Seton Hall
Kyle Wiltjer, Gonzaga

Academic All-Americans
On March 3, 2016, CoSIDA and Capital One announced the 2016 Academic All-America team, with Jarrod Uthoff headlining the University Division as the men's college basketball Academic All-American of the Year.  The following is the 2015–16 Academic All-America Men’s Basketball Team (University Division) as selected by CoSIDA:

(1) = 2014–15 CoSIDA Academic All-America Division I first team
(2) = 2014–15 CoSIDA Academic All-America Division I second team
(3) = 2014–15 CoSIDA Academic All-America Division I third team
(*) = 2013–14 CoSIDA Academic All-America Division I second team

Senior All-Americans
The ten finalists for the Senior CLASS Award are called Senior All-Americans. The 10 honorees are as follows:

References

All-Americans
NCAA Men's Basketball All-Americans